Hrajel (also spelled Harajil) is a town and municipality located in the Keserwan District of the  Keserwan-Jbeil Governorate of Lebanon. It has an average elevation of 1,320 meters above sea level and a total land area of 1,230 hectares. Hrajel's inhabitants are Maronites.

A hidden grotto can be found in Hrajel next to a river that feeds Nahr el Kalb. The grotto is rumored to be a far upward extension of the Jeita grotto but it is currently closed to the public.

History

References

Bibliography

External links
 website: www.hrajel.com

Populated places in Keserwan District
Maronite Christian communities in Lebanon